is a Japanese voice actress from Kanagawa Prefecture who is affiliated with Arts Vision. She debuted as a voice actress in 2015 and started to receive major roles in 2017.

Biography

Filmography

Television anime 
2016
Cardfight!! Vanguard G: NEXT as Schoolgirl
Love Live! Sunshine!! as Schoolgirl
Momokuri as Schoolgirl
2017
Blend S as Mafuyu Hoshikawa
Clean Freak! Aoyama-kun as Moka Gotō
Urara Meirocho as Undulette
2018
After the Rain as Mii
Last Hope as Chun Wu
Yuuna and the Haunted Hot Springs as Koyuzu Shigaraki
2019
Hensuki as Ayano Fujimoto
Fruits Basket as Mio Yamagishi
Star Twinkle PreCure as Anna Amamiya
That Time I Got Reincarnated as a Slime as Ramiris
2020
Tamayomi as Sayumi Ōno
Sakura Wars the Animation as Child 
Higurashi: When They Cry – Gou as ClassmateKuma Kuma Kuma Bear as Ans
2021Farewell, My Dear Cramer as Noriko Okachimachi
2022The Executioner and Her Way of Life as Pandæmonium

Video gamesAtri: My Dear Moments (2020) as Ririka NanamiArknights (2021) as Kirara
 Lackgirl I'' (2022) as Tsumugi

References

External links
  
 

1994 births
Living people
Voice actresses from Kanagawa Prefecture
Japanese video game actresses
Japanese voice actresses
21st-century Japanese actresses
Arts Vision voice actors